Evershed is the surname of:

People
 Edward Evershed (1867–1957), English cricketer
 Frank Evershed (1866–1954), English international rugby union player
 John Evershed (1864–1956), English astronomer, husband of Mary Evershed
 Mary Acworth Evershed (1867–1949), English astronomer
 Raymond Evershed, 1st Baron Evershed (1899–1966), British Law Lord
 Richard Evershed, British biogeochemist
 Sydney Evershed (1861–1937), English brewer and cricketer
 Sydney Evershed (brewer) (1825–1903), English brewer and politician
 Wallis Evershed (1863–1911), English cricketer
 William Evershed (1818–1887), English cricketer

Fictional characters
 Martin Evershed, a teacher in the British television series Ackley Bridge
 Ruth Evershed, an intelligence analyst in the British television series Spooks